"Foolin'" is a 1983 single by English heavy metal band Def Leppard from their diamond album Pyromania. When released as a single later that year, it reached #9 on the Mainstream Rock chart and #28 on the US Billboard Hot 100.

Cash Box said "Foolin'" has "structural similarities to [earlier Def Leppard single] 'Photograph' and follows in that single’s skillful pop blend of melodicism and metallicism."

Music video
The music video was shot in June 1983 at the Ritz Theatre in Elizabeth, New Jersey, and directed by David Mallet. The video shows Elliott escaping from his evil girlfriend in a fantasy sequence, interspersed with scenes of the band performing on a concert stage. It features Billy Idol's then-girlfriend Perri Lister playing the harp with her eyes closed. On the video compilation Historia, the text commentary before this video states, "Indeed, a face without eyes", a pun on Idol's song "Eyes Without a Face". There is also a rare "Performance Only" version of the video, which focuses solely on the concert scenes. This version was briefly shown during the Ultimate Albums episode of the making of Pyromania in 2002.

Track listing

7": Mercury / PolyGram / 814-178-7 (US)
 "Foolin'"
 "Comin' Under Fire"

Charts

References

Def Leppard songs
1983 singles
1983 songs
British heavy metal songs
Mercury Records singles
Music videos directed by David Mallet (director)
Songs written by Robert John "Mutt" Lange
Songs written by Joe Elliott
Songs written by Steve Clark
Song recordings produced by Robert John "Mutt" Lange